Mowmenabad (also Romanized as Mowmenābād and Mo‘menābād; also known as Mow‘men and Mīman) is a village in Doab Rural District, in the Central District of Selseleh County, Lorestan Province, Iran. At the 2006 census, its population was 398, in 79 families.

References 

Towns and villages in Selseleh County